Portunites is an extinct genus of decapod in the family Macropipidae. There are about 12 described species in Portunites.

Species
These 12 species belong to the genus Portunites:

 † Portunites alaskensis Rathbun, 1926
 † Portunites angustata Collins et al., 1999
 † Portunites eocenica Lorenthey, 1929
 † Portunites hoepfneri Moths, 2005
 † Portunites incerta Bell, 1857
 † Portunites kattachiensis Karasawa, 1992
 † Portunites nodosus Schweitzer & Feldmann, 2000
 † Portunites rosenfeldi De Angeli & Garassino, 2006
 † Portunites stintoni Quayle, 1984
 † Portunites sylviae Quayle & Collins, 1981
 † Portunites insculpta Rathbun, 1926
 † Portunites triangulum Rathbun

References

Portunoidea
Articles created by Qbugbot